The 1991–92 NLA season was the 54th regular season of the Nationalliga A, the main professional ice hockey league in Switzerland.

Regular season

Final standings

Scoring leaders

Note: G = Goals; A = Assists; Pts = Points

Playoffs

Quarterfinals

Semifinals

Finals

Scoring leaders

Note: G = Goals; A = Assists; Pts = Points

References
sehv.ch
hockeyarchives.info

External links
hockeyfans.ch
eishockeyforum.ch
spoor.ch

1991–92 in Swiss ice hockey
Swiss